The Sairam Institutions began in 1989 with the start of Sai Matriculation Higher Secondary School in Chennai with just 137 students. Today the Sairam family encompasses more than a dozen institutions including School, Engineering colleges, Medical colleges, Teacher Training institutes and Polytechnic.

Sairam Group

Engineering Colleges
Sri Sairam Engineering College -Tambaram	
Sri Sairam Institute of Technology -Tambaram	
Sri Sairam College of Engineering, Anekal, Bengaluru (Near Hosur)

Medical Colleges
Sri Sairam Siddha Medical College -Tambaram		
Sri Sairam Ayurveda Medical College -Tambaram		
Sri Sairam Homoeopathy Medical College -Tambaram

Schools
Sai Ram Matriculation Higher Secondary School -Tambaram
Sai Matriculation Higher Secondary School -Madipakkam, chennai	
Sairam Vidyalaya (CBSE Syllabus) -Madipakkam, chennai
Sai Ram Matriculation Higher Secondary School, Thiruthuraipoondi 	
Sai Ram Matriculation School, Thiruvarur 
Sai Ram Matriculation Higher Secondary School -Madurai
Sai Ram Vidyalaya (CBSE Syllabus)-Puducherry
Sairam Leo Muthu Public School (CBSE Syllabus)- Medavakkam

Polytechnic Colleges
Sri Sairam Polytechnic College -Tambaram
Sri Sairam I.T.I.,-Vedachandur, Dindigul District
Sai Jothi Polytechnic College -Madurai

Management Studies
Sri Sairam Institute of Management Studies, Chennai,  Tamil Nadu

Research Centre
Sai Ram Advanced Centre for Research, Chennai,  Tamil Nadu

Pre-University
Sri Sairam Pre-University College, Anekal, Bengaluru

Teacher Training Institute
Sri Sairam College of Teacher Training-Puducherry

Affiliations
Directorate of Technical Education, Government of Tamil Nadu
 Anna University, Chennai
Directorate of School Education, Government of Tamil Nadu
 The Dr.MGR Medical University, Chennai

References TTP Sairam is worst in the school of Thiruthuraipoondi

External links
Sairam TIES 2015
Sairam Institutions - Leo Muthu Indoor Stadium  by Little Master Sachin Tendulkar
Sai Ram Group of Institutions - Video
Sri Sai Ram Engineering College IEEE Students Chapter
About Sri Sai Ram Engineering College on Anna University

Engineering colleges in Chennai